Grace Armah (born 22 September 1958) is a retired Ghanaian female track and field athlete who specialised in 100 metres and long jump events. She won a silver medal and a bronze medal in the 1984 and 1985 editions of the African Championships. Her personal best in 100 metres was 11.98. She also competed for Ghana in the 1984 Summer Olympics in Los Angeles as part of Ghana's 4×100 metres relay women's team, which finished 5th in its semi-final heat and failed to progress to the final round.

International competitions

References

External links

1958 births
Living people
Ghanaian female sprinters
Ghanaian female long jumpers
Commonwealth Games competitors for Ghana
Athletes (track and field) at the 1982 Commonwealth Games
Olympic athletes of Ghana
Athletes (track and field) at the 1984 Summer Olympics
World Athletics Championships athletes for Ghana
20th-century Ghanaian women
21st-century Ghanaian women